Bernstein Castle is a historical building in Bernstein im Burgenland, Austria, first mentioned in the 13th century.

History
In 860 the whole region was part of the archbishopric of Salzburg. Erimbert, a liege of the archbishopric, handed over the Pinka  to  one  Jacobus. The village name Rettenbach was not mentioned yet, but the old Slavic name of the nearby hamlet Grodnau (meaning "the village belonging to the castle") is a sign of the existence of a nearby castle, identifiable with castle Bernstein.

Since 1199 the castle was part of Hungary. It is not exactly known  when the castle was handed over to Frederick II, Duke of Austria, and how long it was his property; but in 1236 Béla IV of Hungary conquered the castle. Some years later (in 1260) he gave it to count Henry I Kőszegi.

In 1336 the counts of Güssing and Bernstein were defeated by the Hungarian King Charles Robert of Anjou, and the castle of Bernstein became part of the Hungarian Kingdom. In 1388 the castle was given to the Kanizsai family. In 1482 it became property of Matthias Corvinus of Hungary for a short time; in 1487  Hans von Königsberg  received the castle from Emperor Frederick III.

In 1529 the Turks besieged the castle, but they were not able to capture it. Another unsuccessful siege by the Turks followed in 1532. On that occasion the ring of bastions was erected in order to change the castle into a refuge.

In 1604 castle Bernstein was unsuccessfully besieged for weeks by a combined army consisting of Hungarians, Turks, and Tatars under the leadership of Stephen Bocskay.  Due to an explosion of the gunpowder storeroom, in  1617 Ludwig Königsberg ordered the rebuilding of the Gothic inner part of the castle in Baroque style. The keep and towers were eliminated. A short time later (1644) Ehrenreich Christoph Königsberg sold the sovereignty and the castle to Count Ádám Batthyány. In 1864   Gustav Batthyány sold the castle to his manciple Edward O'Egan, whose heirs finally sold the castle to Eduard von Almásy. His family currently owns the castle. In 1953 a part of the castle was  turned into a  hotel and restaurant.

References

External links
 Website of the Hotel Castle Bernstein with history and pictures of the interior
Aerial photography gallery

Castles in Burgenland
Hotels in Austria